Gogalgaon is a village in Rahata taluka of Ahmednagar district in the Indian state of Maharashtra.

Location
Village is located at the south part of Rahata taluka and it is near to Loni village.

Population
According to the 2011 census, the population of the village is 3120, out of which 1,060 are male residents and 922 are female residents.

Economy
Most of the village residents are engaged in agriculture and allied works.

Transport

Road
Kolhar-Loni-Nandur Shingote highway passes through the village.

Rail
Shirdi and Belapur railway stations are the nearest railway station to village.

Air
Shirdi Airport is the nearest airport to village.

See also
List of villages in Rahata taluka

References 

Villages in Ahmednagar district